Macquarie Plains is a rural locality in the local government area of Derwent Valley in the South-east region of Tasmania. The 2016 census has a population of 44 for the state suburb of Macquarie Plains.

History
Macquarie Plains was gazetted as a locality in 1959. The locality was named in honour of New South Wales Governor Lachlan Macquarie.

Geography
The Derwent River forms most of the western boundary, all of the southern, and part of the eastern. It also flows through the central western section from north to south. The Derwent Valley rail line passes through from south-east to west.

Road infrastructure
The B61 route (Gordon River Road) enters from the north-east and runs through to the west, where it exits.

References

Localities of Derwent Valley Council
Towns in Tasmania